Nishani is a surname. Notable people with the surname include:

Omer Nishani (1887–1954), President of Albania (1943–1953)
Bujar Nishani (born 1966), President of Albania (2012–2017)

See also
Nishani — a 2014 Nepali movie about Gurkhas